Andrzej Miłosz (19 September 1917, Vilnius – 21 September 2002, Warsaw) was a Polish journalist, translator of literature and film subtitles, and documentary-film maker. During World War II he was a member of the anti-Nazi resistance, soldier of the Home Army (AK) and ZWZ. He organized the first courier routes in Wilno.

He was the brother of Nobel-winning poet and writer, Czesław Miłosz.

Books 
Uśmiech Bez Parandży, 1973 [with Grażyna Miłosz]
Kaukaz, 1979 [with Grażyna Miłosz]
Kaukaz i Zakaukazie. Mały przewodnik turystyczny, 1981 [with Grażyna Miłosz]

Films 
2000 - Wilno Milosza ;
2000 - Przysnil Mi Sie Sen Powrotu ;  
1999 - Henio (a film about Henryk Blaszczyk, whose disappearance sparked the Kielce pogrom) ; 
1999 - Pogrom - Kielce 1946 ;
1998 - Takie Ze Mnie Dziwadlo ;
1997 - Wizy Zycia ( Consul Sugihara and visas for life ) ;
1994 - Krwia i Rymem ( By Blood and Verse ) ;
1965 - Ludzie z Nordu ;
1960 - Na Gruzach Dawnych Kultur ;

He has been honored by Israel's Yad Vashem memorial to the Holocaust as one of the Righteous among the Nations.

He is survived by his daughter Joanna Milosz (also known as Joanna Milosz-Piekarska)

References

1917 births
2002 deaths
Home Army members
Polish translators
Polish film producers
Polish people of Lithuanian descent
Polish Righteous Among the Nations
20th-century translators
20th-century Polish journalists
People associated with the magazine "Kultura"